Chew Kin Wah (born 30 September 1965) is a Malaysian actor of Chinese descent. In June 2018, he was listed as one of the 10 top Malaysian actors who gain recognition internationally by Harian Metro.

Born and raised in Ipoh, Perak, Kin Wah starting his acting career in 1993. He appear in ntv7's longest-running television sitcom Kopitiam, co-starring Joanna Bessey, Rashid Salleh, and Mano Maniam.

Kin Wah converted to Islam in 2013 and adopted the Muslim name Anuar Chew or Anuar Abdullah.

Filmography

Films

Television series

Telemovie

Television

Awards and nominations

References

External links
 

1965 births
Living people
Malaysian Muslims
Malaysian male actors
People from Perak
Malaysian expatriates in Indonesia
Converts to Islam